The following is a list of contemporary ethnic groups. There has been constant debate over the classification of ethnic groups. Membership of an ethnic group tends to be associated with shared ancestry, history, homeland, language or dialect and cultural heritage; where the term "culture" specifically includes aspects such as religion, mythology and ritual, cuisine, dressing (clothing) style and other factors.

By the nature of the concept, ethnic groups tend to be divided into subgroups, which may themselves be or not be identified as independent ethnic groups depending on the source consulted.

Ethnic groups

The following groups are commonly identified as "ethnic groups", as opposed to ethno-linguistic phyla, national groups, racial groups or similar.

Lists of ethnic groups
by status:
 List of Indigenous peoples
 List of diasporas
 List of stateless nations

regional lists:
 Ethnic groups in Asia
 Ethnic groups in Northern Asia
 List of ethnic groups in Russia
 List of ethnic groups in East Asia
 List of ethnic groups in China
 List of ethnic groups in Japan
 List of ethnic groups in North Korea
 List of ethnic groups in South Korea
 List of ethnic groups in Taiwan
 List of indigenous peoples of Taiwan
 South Asian ethnic groups
 Ethnic groups in Nepal
 Ethnic groups in Pakistan
 Demographics of Sindh
 List of ethnic groups in Laos
 Ethnic groups in Malaysia
 List of ethnic groups in Vietnam
 List of ethnic groups in Burma
 Ethnic groups in the Middle East
 African people
 Indigenous people of Africa
 Ethnic groups in Chad
 List of ethnic groups in Rivers State
 List of ethnic groups in Tanzania
 European people
 Classification of indigenous peoples of the Americas
 List of Indigenous Australian group names
 Ethnoreligious group

See also
 Uncontacted peoples
 Ethnic flag
 List of language families
 Lists of people by nationality
 Lists of active separatist movements
 Race (human categorization)
 List of Y-chromosome haplogroups in populations of the world

Notes

References

 

 

Society-related lists
Contemporary